Joey Suk (born 8 July 1990) is a Dutch professional football player who plays for HNK Gorica in Croatia as a midfielder. Suk has Dutch-Indonesian roots. Besides the Netherlands, he has played in Croatia.

Early life
Suk was born in Deventer, Overijssel, a town in eastern Netherlands.

Career

Suk started his career at local Deventer club DVV Davo. He was picked up by Deventer's only professional club, Go Ahead Eagles as a youth player.

Suk made his league debut on 6 February 2009, in Go Ahead Eagles' away-match against FC Omniworld. Surprisingly, he was in the starting lineup and stayed there until the end of the match. The game ended 2–1 for the Eagles.

The following season, he became a regular for the Deventer side, featuring in 22 matches and scoring four goals. This created interest from several unnamed clubs.

On 5 January 2013, Suk signed with Beerschot until the summer of 2016. However, after Beerschot's bankruptcy Suk became without a club.

On 14 June 2014, Suk signed a three-year contract with NAC Breda. In his first season, Suk relegated to the Eerste Divisie.

On 13 June 2016, Suk returned to his former club Go Ahead Eagles on a free transfer, despite his contract with NAC Breda officially terminated in mid 2017.

International career
As recently the Football Association of Indonesia had called some of the Indonesian players oversea to play for Indonesia. Suk, with his teammate Diego Michiels, was called to join Indonesia U23 in 2012 AFC Men's Pre-Olympic Tournament against Turkmenistan U23. But, due to their Indonesian citizenship haven't done yet, they can only play for the second leg in Ashkhabad, Turkmenistan, 9 March 2011. His citizenship is finally done on 7 April 2011. Joey, along with the other two naturalized players, will be able to play for Indonesia in 2011 SEA Games.

But then the status of naturalization of Joey Suk become something unfinished case. He never played for Indonesia, and the calling from national team also never reach him, the status of the naturalization process since become idle.

Trivia
Suk has two tattoos; one which shows his love for his hometown Deventer, and one on his back, that shows a cross with angel wings and his name, Joey Suk, above.

References

External links
 Voetbal International profile 
 Official Joey Suk profile on GA-Eagles.nl 
 

1989 births
Living people
Dutch footballers
Dutch people of Indonesian descent
Footballers from Deventer
Expatriate footballers in Croatia
Go Ahead Eagles players
NAC Breda players
Eredivisie players
Eerste Divisie players
Beerschot A.C. players
HNK Gorica players
Belgian Pro League players
Croatian Football League players
Association football midfielders
Dutch expatriate sportspeople in Croatia
Dutch expatriate footballers
Expatriate footballers in Belgium
Dutch expatriate sportspeople in Belgium